The China Railways "Dongfang Hong" diesel-hydraulic locomotive classes DFH2, DFH5, DFH6, and DFH7, built from the 1970s to 1990s, were all used as shunters on the Chinese railway network.

The use of diesel-hydraulic shunters has fallen out of favour on the Chinese rail network, with diesel-electric locomotives being used. However, diesel-hydraulic machines continued to be produced for industrial railways – mainly the China Railways GK classes.

The DFH21 class is a meter gauge version of the DFH2, and was used on the Yunnan–Vietnam Railway for both passenger and freight services; the same machines are used on the Vietnam Railways where they are known as the D10H.

China Railways standard gauge

DFH2
The DHF2 was originally designed by Sifang locomotive works in 1966 as a passenger locomotive of rated power .

The locomotive used a 12V180ZL engine and SF2010 transmission.

DFH5

In comparison to the DFH2 type, a number of changes were made for the DFH5: a twin-speed transmission allowing a higher top speed when running without a heavy load was included, and the mass was increased to improve traction.

The DFH5 class was produced in large quantities.

DFH5C was produced for operations in metalworks.

DFH6
One example was produced for shunting in the Chinese port of Huangpu District, Shanghai.

DFH7
Four units were produced for shunting in mines and industrial environments.

Metre gauge

DFH21

Locomotives similar in design to the DFH2 type but built to meter gauge and used as universal locomotives. The locomotives were used on the Kunming metre gauge railway, including passenger services.

As of 2012, Kunming rail fans report that DFH21 locomotives are still used to haul a few passenger trains a day along the metre gauge tracks from Kunming North Railway Station to several nearby stations. , these trains were still in operation.

30 of the locomotives are also used by Vietnam Railways, where they are known as the D10H. In 2005, Vietnam railways had 20 units operational. In 2009, ten of the engines had Caterpillar Inc. 3512B engines fitted as replacements.

Preserved locomotives
DFH2 0008 and DFH5 0001 are both preserved at the Beijing China Railway Museum.

References

Images

External links

 ☆中国鉄道博物館　車両図録☆ Railway museum Beijing, diesel hydraulic gallery, www.geocities.jp

DFH
B-B locomotives
Standard gauge locomotives of China
Metre gauge diesel locomotives